is a Japanese singer and actor. He was formerly under the management of Johnny & Associates as a member of Japanese boy bands Kanjani Eight and News. His first solo album was released in December 2019.

Biography
Ryo Nishikido was born in Hyogo on November 3, 1984, and raised in Osaka. He was selected as a member of the Johnny's Jr. collective in 1997, and subsequently made his major debut in 2004 as an actor and a singer with pop band News. Ryo N. was also the co-lead vocalist and second guitarist for Kanjani Eight, a Johnny & Associates boy band made up of Johnny's Jr. members originating from the Kansai region in Japan. Ryo N. held his first solo concert in 2006. He also started playing major supporting roles on prime-time television dramas such as 1 Litre of Tears, Attention Please and Last Friends. He won several acting awards for his portrayal of an abusive boyfriend in Last Friends.

Ryo N. made his big-screen debut in summer 2010, playing the lead role in A Boy and His Samurai. In the film, he played a time-travelling samurai who arrived in modern Japan and became a patissier. He also starred in the detective drama Joker: Yurusarezaru Sōsakan and romantic comedy Full Throttle Girl in 2011.

From 2004 to 2011, Ryo N. was active in both News and Kanjani Eight, releasing 9 studio albums and going on nationwide tours with both bands, which was unusual for an idol. On October 7, 2011, Johnny & Associates announced that Ryo N. would be leaving NEWS due to scheduling conflicts making it difficult for him to continue as an active member of both News and Kanjani Eight.

Between 2012 and 2014, Ryo N. took on leading roles in comedy-dramas such as the semi-autobiographical Papadol!, The Fortune Telling Shop, Onmyoya and Gomen ne Seishun. He also starred in films Hospitality Department and I Just Wanna Hug You. As part of Kanjani Eight, he also co-hosts variety programmes such as Kanjani8 no Janiben on Kansai TV and appeared on the Kōhaku thrice. He was also in the action comedy films Eight Ranger and Eight Ranger 2 with his group.

Ryo N. starred in Daihachi Yoshida’s black comedy The Scythian Lamb in 2018.

In March 2019, news of his decision to leave Johnny & Associates emerged from the weekly magazine Shūkan Bunshun. Ryo N. subsequently announced in September 2019 that he was leaving Johnny & Associates and Kanjani Eight at the end of the month.

Personal life 
Ryo N.'s family are his parents, two elder brothers, and a younger sister. His father is from Amakusa, Kumamoto and his mother is from Amami, Kagoshima both located in Kyushu region of Japan.

Discography

Albums 
Nomad (December 11, 2019)
Note (January 27, 2021)
Nocturnal (November 30, 2022)

Television dramas

Film

Variety shows

Awards
2003–2004 Nikkan Sports Drama Grand Prix: Best Newcomer for Teru Teru Kazoku
57th Television Drama Academy Awards: Best Supporting Actor for Last Friends
18th TV Life Annual Drama Awards 2008: Supporting Actor for Last Friends
18th TV Life Annual Drama Awards 2008: Supporting Actor for Ryusei no Kizuna
Fall 2008 Nikkan Sports Awards: Best Supporting Actor for Last Friends
Summer 2009 Nikkan Sports Awards: Best Supporting Actor for Orthros no Inu

References

External links

1984 births
Living people
20th-century Japanese male actors
21st-century Japanese male actors
21st-century Japanese male singers
21st-century Japanese singers
Japanese idols
Japanese male pop singers
Japanese tenors
Kanjani Eight members
Musicians from Osaka Prefecture
News (band) members
People from Kadoma, Osaka